John Rankin (born 27 June 1983) is a Scottish football coach and former player, who is currently the head coach of Hamilton Academical. Rankin played as a central midfielder for Ross County, Inverness Caledonian Thistle, Hibernian, Dundee United, Falkirk, Queen of the South and Clyde. Rankin also played once for a Scotland B team, in 2006.

Playing career

Early career
Rankin started his career at English Premier League club Manchester United but did not make any first team appearances. Whilst at the Red Devils, he was loaned out to Corinthians, along with Ben Muirhead by Alex Ferguson, to gain experience before returning to Manchester United. However, his time there was a disaster, as he explained about how both players struggled for food whilst there:

Rankin also spoke about the poverty he had seen in his time in Brazil:

Rankin was released by Manchester United in June 2003. After unsuccessful trials with a number of Scottish Premier League clubs Rankin signed for Scottish First Division club Ross County in 2003 and played in 101 league matches for the Dingwall club and scored 17 goals. Rankin also received two league Player of the Year awards.

Inverness Caledonian Thistle
Rankin moved to Highland derby rivals Inverness Caledonian Thistle for a reported fee of £65,000 in 2006, making him one of several players to have played for both Highland clubs. Rankin played in 49 league matches and scored 9 goals for the Caley Jags that included a stunning last minute winner versus Rangers on 27 December 2006.

Hibernian
In January 2008, Rankin moved to Hibernian for a fee of £110,000. Rankin scored the opening goal in a 2–0 win for Hibs against Celtic on 7 December 2008. The goal was notable because it was scored from a yard in front of the centre circle, approximately 45 yards from the goal. The shot dipped and deceived the Celtic goalkeeper, Polish international Artur Boruc. After the game, Rankin described the shot as a "squiggler".

Rankin was a candidate for the Hibs captaincy after Rob Jones left for Scunthorpe United in the summer of 2009. New manager John Hughes decided to give the armband to Chris Hogg, however, with Ian Murray to serve as Hogg's vice captain. Rankin fell out of favour under Colin Calderwood and was told in March 2011 that his contract would not be renewed. Rankin played in 100 league matches for the Hibees and scored 6 goals.

Dundee United
Rankin signed a two-year contract with Dundee United on 17 May 2011. He scored five goals for United as the team finished fourth in the 2011–12 Scottish Premier League season and qualified for the 2012–13 UEFA Europa League. In June 2012, Rankin agreed an extended contract with United. He was appointed chairman of PFA Scotland in February 2013, replacing Jack Ross. On 26 February 2014, Rankin agreed a two-year contract extension. On 4 May 2016 it was announced that he would be one of eight out-of-contract players leaving the club at the end of the season, having not been offered a new contract. Rankin played in 173 league matches for Dundee United and scored 12 goals.

Falkirk
On 22 July 2016, Rankin signed for Falkirk, having spent time training with the club. Rankin left Falkirk on 5 January 2017 after the club agreed to terminate his contract. Rankin played in 13 league matches for the Bairns without scoring any goals.

Queen of the South
On 5 January 2017, Rankin joined Queen of the South on an 18-month contract, until the end of the 2017–18 season. Rankin was appointed Queens' club captain by recently appointed manager Gary Naysmith before the league match at St Mirren on 7 January 2017, taking over from previous captain Chris Higgins.

In March 2017, Rankin was appointed as the Under-17s coach at Heart of Midlothian, which he combined with his playing duties at the Doonhamers. Rankin relinquished his position as chairman of PFA Scotland in February 2018 and he departed the Dumfries club at the end of the 2017–18 season. Rankin played in 51 league matches for the Doonhamers and scored two goals.

Clyde
On 9 June 2018, Rankin signed a one-year contract with his local club Clyde.

He was nominated for SPFL goal of the month for in successive months.

Rankin suffered a broken ankle in the penultimate league match of the season and missed the play-offs, but the club still won promotion to League One. At the PFA Scotland awards, he was shortlisted for Player of the Year and named in the Team of the Year for League Two.

During the 2018–19 season, Rankin scored nine goals in 39 appearances.

International career
Rankin represented Scotland B, in a match versus Turkey B in 2006, when he was a Ross County player.

Coaching career
Towards the end of his playing career Rankin took a youth coaching position with Heart of Midlothian. He moved to Hamilton Academical as assistant head coach in December 2021, and was promoted to the position of head coach in June 2022.

Career statistics

Managerial record

Honours

Club 
 Man Utd Reserves
 Premier Reserve League North: 2001–02

 Ross County
 Scottish Challenge Cup: Runner-up 2004–05

Dundee United
Scottish Cup: Runner-up 2013–14
Scottish League Cup: Runner-up 2014–15

 Clyde
Scottish League Two: Promotion 2018–19

 Scotland U16s
 Victory Shield: 1997–98

Individual
 SPFA First Division Player of the Year: 2005–06
 Scottish Football League Player of the Year: 2005–06
 PFAS League Two Team of the Year: 2018–19
 Scottish First Division Player of the Month: November 2005, January 2006
 Scottish First Division Young Player of the Month: December 2003

See also
List of footballers in Scotland by number of league appearances (500+)

References

1983 births
Association football midfielders
Dundee United F.C. players
Hibernian F.C. players
Inverness Caledonian Thistle F.C. players
Living people
Manchester United F.C. players
Ross County F.C. players
Scotland B international footballers
Scottish Football League players
Scottish footballers
Scottish Premier League players
Scottish Professional Football League players
Footballers from Bellshill
Falkirk F.C. players
Heart of Midlothian F.C. non-playing staff
Queen of the South F.C. players
Clyde F.C. players
Scottish trade unionists
Hamilton Academical F.C. non-playing staff
Scottish football managers
Hamilton Academical F.C. managers
Scottish Professional Football League managers